One Man Star Wars Trilogy is an Off-Broadway play based on the original Star Wars trilogy, written and performed by Canadian actor Charles Ross, and directed by TJ Dawe. It premiered in Toronto, Ontario in January, 2001, and has since toured worldwide, with over 1,000 performances in 119 cities as of March 2007.

One man play
First performed at the Pavilion Theatre, in Kamloops, British Columbia, Canada, the play runs for 75 minutes (although earlier incarnations lasted for one hour) and has only one cast member. Ross plays all the characters, recreates the effects, inserts factoids when appropriate, sings from the John Williams score, flies the ships, and fights both sides of the battles. The inspiration came from playing frisbee with friends; the thrower would say a line from the movies, and the catcher had to say the following line while catching.

His impersonation of R2-D2 has been described as spot on, but Ross himself has said, "I've always thought my Yoda voice sounded too much like a goblin sucking helium." Ross has purportedly seen the original trilogy over 400 times.

The show is licensed by Lucasfilm. Charles Ross has also used the concept with other film trilogies, including "One Man Lord of the Rings", which was performed from 2004 to 2005. Ross was asked to stop performing by the intellectual property holder. The legal issues have since been resolved and he performed the "One Man Lord of the Rings" show at the 2009 Edinburgh Fringe.

Performances
One Man Star Wars Trilogy has toured and appeared on several television shows, including NBC's Late Night with Conan O'Brien  and CBS's Late Late Show. Ross has performed the show for Vin Diesel and the rest of the cast on the set of The Chronicles of Riddick, at the world science fiction convention masquerade half time show (Noreascon) in 2004, at Star Wars Celebrations III and IV, and Comic-Con International 2004 in San Diego. He also hosted a month-long sold-out run at the Edinburgh Fringe in the E4 Cow Barn in 2006.

References

External links
 Official website

Canadian plays
Star Wars fandom
2001 plays
Plays for one performer